Frederick Gordon Phillips (13 March 1884 – 19 January 1948) was a Welsh field hockey player from Newport, Monmouthshire, who won a bronze medal as part of the Welsh team in the 1908 Summer Olympics.

References

External links
 
Frederick Phillips' profile at databaseOlympics

1884 births
1948 deaths
Welsh male field hockey players
Olympic field hockey players of Great Britain
British male field hockey players
Field hockey players at the 1908 Summer Olympics
Olympic bronze medallists for Great Britain
Sportspeople from Newport, Wales
Olympic medalists in field hockey
Welsh Olympic medallists
Medalists at the 1908 Summer Olympics